Forrestfield is an electoral district of the Legislative Assembly in the Australian state of Western Australia, based in the eastern suburbs of Perth.

Geography
Based in the eastern suburbs of Perth, the district has a north–south elongation covering three separate built up areas. In the north, the district takes in the suburbs of High Wycombe, Maida Vale and a small part of Gooseberry Hill; in the middle it covers most of Forrestfield, Wattle Grove and part of Kewdale; whilst to the south is the suburb of Kenwick plus part of Maddington and Orange Grove.

History
Forrestfield was first contested at the 2008 state election. It was a new seat created as a result of the one vote one value reforms. A plurality of the new district's voters came from the district of Darling Range, which was radically redrawn. The northernmost part of the electorate was constructed from parts of Belmont and Midland, whilst the voters in the southern part of the district were drawn in from Kenwick.

Members for Forrestfield

Election results

References

External links
 
 

Electoral districts of Western Australia